Medieval European Coinage is a book series on medieval coins published by Cambridge University Press in association with the Fitzwilliam Museum, Cambridge. The project was the idea of professor Philip Grierson (1910-2006) and Mark Blackburn (1953-2011) was the first general editor. It will cover the coinages of Europe for the period c.450-1500. It has been described as the "first comprehensive survey of European medieval coinages since the Traité de numismatique du moyen âge of Engel and Serrure" (1891-1905).

Volumes
The volumes so far published and announced are:

 1. The Early Middle Ages (5th-10th Centuries). P. Grierson and M. A. S. Blackburn (published 1986). 
 2. Germany I: Western Germany. P. Ilisch (in preparation). 
 3. Germany II: North-eastern Germany 
 4. Germany III: Central and Southern Germany 
 5 (a). France I: The age of the denier. M. Bompaire (in preparation). 
 5 (b). France II: Later royal and feudal coinages. 
 6. The Iberian Peninsula. M. Crusafont, A. M. Balaguer (published 2013). 
 7 (a) The Low Countries I: The Early Coinage and the Pre-Burgundian South. P. Grierson, P. Spufford and S. Boffa (in preparation). 
 7 (b) The Low Countries II: The North and the Burgundian Period. P. Grierson, P. Spufford and S. Boffa (in preparation). 
 8. Britain and Ireland, c.400-1066. R. Naismith (published 2017). 
 9. (a). British Isles, 1066–1279. M. Allen (in preparation). 
 9. (b). British Isles, 1279–1509. 
 10. The Nordic Countries. J. Steen Jensen and E. Screen (in preparation). 
 11. Hungary and the Balkans. E. Oberländer-Târnoveanu (in preparation). 
 12. Italy I: Northern Italy. W. R. Day Jr., M. Matzke and A. Saccocci (published 2016). 
 13. Italy II: Central Italy. W. R. Day Jr. (in preparation). 
 14. Italy III: South Italy, Sicily, Sardinia. P. Grierson and L. Travaini (published 1998). 
 15. Central and Eastern Europe. B. Paszkiewicz (in preparation). 
 16. The Latin East. J. Baker, R. Kelleher and R. Kool (in preparation). 
 17. Kingdoms of Arles and Lorraine

References 

Cambridge University Press books
Numismatic catalogs
Series of history books
Fitzwilliam Museum